Bishop & Sons' Depositories Limited, more commonly known as Bishop's Move, was founded by J.J. Bishop in 1854 as a general cartage and removals business in Pimlico, London, and has grown into an international removals, storage, and shipping company. Horses were used to transport the company's wagons up until the 1930s, when motor vehicles were introduced to the fleet. During both World Wars, Bishop's Move provided vital removal services for government departments, as well as the relocation of precious museum pieces. The name Bishop's Move was officially registered on 10 November 1955 and the company has been trading as this ever since.

Bishop's Move has 27 UK branches, alongside two European branches in Spain and Gibraltar. In January 2013, Bishop's Move relocated the new Archbishop of Canterbury, Justin Welby, from Durham to Lambeth Palace. After 160 years, Bishop's Move is still a family-run business, with members of the sixth generation of Bishops working throughout the company.

References

Removal companies of the United Kingdom
Companies based in the City of Westminster